The Muze spiny mouse (Acomys muzei) is a species of rodent in the family Muridae found in the Democratic Republic of Congo, Zambia, and Tanzania.

References

muzei
Rodents of Africa
Mammals of Zambia
Mammals of Tanzania
Mammals described in 2011